María del Carmen Vaz (born 9 May 1968) is a Spanish windsurfer. She competed in the women's sailing event at the 2000 Summer Olympics.

References

1968 births
Living people
Spanish female sailors (sport)
Olympic sailors of Spain
Sailors at the 2000 Summer Olympics – Mistral One Design
Spanish windsurfers
Female windsurfers